

Episodes

Power Rangers Jungle Fury (Season 16, 2008)

Power Rangers RPM (Season 17, 2009)

Mighty Morphin Power Rangers (Re-version, 2010)

Power Rangers Samurai / Super Samurai

Power Rangers Megaforce / Super Megaforce

Power Rangers Dino Charge / Dino Super Charge

Power Rangers Ninja Steel / Super Ninja Steel

Power Rangers Beast Morphers

Power Rangers Dino Fury

Power Rangers Cosmic Fury  (Season 30, 2023)

Notes

References

Power Rangers